Marfa (Russian: Марфа) is an East Slavic given name, a variant of Martha. 
 Marfa Alekseyevna of Russia (1652–1707), Moscow Tsarina and Orthodox saint
 , 18th-century Russian Orthodox saint
 Marfa Apraksina (1664–1716), second wife of Tsar Feodor III of Russia
 Marfa Boretskaya, 15th-century mayoress of Novgorod and a staunch opponent of Ivan III of Russia
 Marfa Dhervilly (1876–1963), French stage and film actress
 Marfa Ekimova (born 2005), Russian born British rhythmic gymnast 
 Marfa Inofuentes Pérez (1969–2015), Afro-Bolivian activist
 Marfa Kokina (died after 1800), Russian industrialist
 Marfa Kryukova (1876–1954), Russian folklore performer and storyteller
 Marfa Rabkova (born 1995), Belarusian human rights activist
 Marfa Dmitrievna Sharoiko (1898–1978), Soviet-Belarusian politician
 Marfa (or Marta) Samuilovna Skavronskaya (1684–1727), better known as Catherine I of Russia
 Marfa Sobakina (1552–1571), third wife of Ivan the Terrible, Tsar of Russia
  (1922–2009), Ukrainian artist and master of Petrykivka painting style

See also

Feminine given names
Slavic feminine given names